Émilie Marie Bouchaud (14 May 1874 – 14 October 1939), better known by her stage name Polaire, was a French singer and actress. She was known for her wasp waist which, achieved through corsetry, reportedly measured less than 16 inches (41 cm), although pictures of her show distinct signs of retouching around the waist, which may mean her waist was much more normal than reported. She was also known for her eccentric stage presence, which generated mixed receptions.

Biography

Early life
Bouchaud was born in Agha, Algiers, French Algeria on 14 May 1874; according to her memoirs she was one of eleven children of whom only four – Émilie, her two brothers Edmond and Marcel, and a sister, Lucile – survived infancy. Their father died of typhoid fever when Émilie was five and their mother, unable to support them alone, temporarily placed the four children with their grandmother in Algiers. Marcel died shortly after. In 1889, after their mother began a relationship with a man named Emmanuel Borgia, the family moved with him to Paris. There her mother found work, and also tried to find domestic employment for her daughter. Eventually however, after her sister Lucile fell sick and died, Émilie was sent back to her grandmother in Algiers.

Borgia, her mother and only surviving sibling Edmond remained in Paris. Emilie did not settle, and in September 1890 ran away to rejoin her mother in France.  Afraid however of meeting up with her mother's partner, Borgia, (whom she accuses in her memoirs of having tried to molest her), she first approached her brother Edmond.  He had already gained some fame as a café-concert singer under the name of Dufleuve, and with his help she auditioned successfully for her first job as a café singer, aged about 17.

Career

Polaire's career in the entertainment industry stretched from the early 1890s to the mid-1930s, and encompassed the range from music-hall singer to stage and film actress. Her most successful period professionally was from the mid-1890s to the beginning of the First World War.

Adopting the stage name Polaire ("Pole Star"), she worked first as a music-hall singer and dancer: one of her earliest hits was performing the French version of Ta-ra-ra Boom-de-ay. Having quickly made a name for herself – Toulouse-Lautrec portrayed her on a magazine cover in 1895 – Polaire briefly visited New York, appearing there as a chanteuse at various venues, but without achieving major success. On her return to Paris she extended her range and went on to act in serious theatre. Her first major appearance was in 1902, at the Théâtre des Bouffes Parisiens, in the title role of a play based on Colette's Claudine à Paris. A comedic actress, Polaire became one of the major celebrities of her day and later, as cinema developed, appeared in several films.

In 1909, Polaire was cast in her first silent-film role in Moines et guerriers. In 1910 she returned to the stage, appearing in London and later in New York. (1910 was the date of her first visit to the U.S. as a celebrity, and publicity releases did not mention her earlier appearances in 1895.) In 1912, back in France, she was offered a role in a film by the up-and-coming young director Maurice Tourneur.  She appeared in six of his films in 1912 and 1913. She then returned to the musical stage and began a second tour of the United States, after which she appeared at the London Coliseum. In 1915 Polaire made frequent appearances in London, and involved herself in wartime fund-raising efforts. She returned to films in 1922, but in the declining years of her career had to be content with lesser roles.

Her precise filmography is difficult to determine due to confusion between her and a younger Italian actress with the screen name "Pauline Polaire", who also featured in early films. Her last film appearance was in 1935 in Arènes joyeuses, directed by Karl Anton.

Appearance
She was skilled in using her appearance to attract attention. In her early days as a café singer in the 1890s, she wore very short skirts and also cropped her hair, fashions that did not become common in the rest of society until the 1920s. A brunette, she wore unusually heavy eye makeup, deliberately evocative of the Arab world. That accentuated her large bust, which was said to measure . Her striking appearance, both on and off stage, contributed to her celebrity.

For her 1910 supposed "debut" in New York, she provocatively allowed herself to be billed in the advance publicity as "the ugliest woman in the world" and, departing on a transatlantic liner, she was apparently accompanied by a "black slave". Returning to America in 1913, she brought a diamond-collared pet pig, Mimi, and wore a nose-ring. Talk of her figure and her lavish overdressing in fur coats and dazzling jewels preceded her appearances wherever she went. Jean Lorrain said of her:

She was a frequent subject for artists; those who painted her include Henri de Toulouse-Lautrec, Antonio de La Gandara, Leonetto Cappiello, Rupert Carabin, Mme. Dreyfus Gonzales and Jean Sala.

Death
Polaire's finances suffered from a series of actions by the French tax authorities and she struggled to find stage or screen roles as she aged.  She may have suffered from depression.

She died on 14 October 1939, aged 65, in Champigny-sur-Marne, Val-de-Marne, France. Her body was buried at the Cimetière du Centre, in the eastern Paris suburb of Champigny-sur-Marne.

Partial discography
All songs are included in the compilation album, Eugénie Buffet et Polaire: Succès et Raretés (1918-1936), released under a French record label, Chansophone.

 Allo Chéri (Boyer–Stamper) - Pathé 4970 - Matrix No. 2485 - 8 May 1918
 Pour être heureux (Yvain) - Aérophone - No. 1467 - 1920
 La Glu (Richepin–Fragerole) - Aérophone - No. 1468 - 1920
 Tchike Tchike (Scotto) - Odéon 75143 - 1923
 Pour être heureux (Yvain) - Odéon 75143 - Matrix No. K1-510 - 1923
 Nocturne (Nozière) - Gramophone K-5798 - Matrix No. BS 4432-1 et 4433-2 - 1929
 La Glu (Richepin–Fragerole) - Polydor 521531 - Matrix No. 2170 BK - 1929
 Le P'tit Savoyard - Polydor 521531 - Matrix No. 2170 BK - 1929
 Le Train du rêve (Aubret–Lenoir) - Parlophone 22716 - Matrix No. Pa 106124-2 - 1930
 Le Premier Voyage (Lenoir) - Parlophone 22716 - Matrix No. Pa 106165-2 - 1930
 La Prière de la Charlotte (Jehan Rictus; arr. Warms) - Cristal 6263 - Matrix No. CP 2082 and 2083 - 1936

Selected filmography
 Le dernier pardon (1913)
 Les gaîtés de l'escadron (1913) 
 Soeurette (1914)
 Monsieur Lecoq (1914)
 Le masque du vice (1917)
 Amour... amour... (1932) 
 Arènes joyeuses (1935)

See also
Antonio de La Gandara
Tightlacing
Corset

References

External links

 
 Polaire – Une étoile de la belle époque
 Du temps des cerises aux feuilles mortes
 L'étoile polaire
 
 

1874 births
1939 deaths
French silent film actresses
French women singers
French stage actresses
People from Algiers
20th-century French actresses
French people in French Algeria